Edgar Isaac Lansbury (3 April 1887 – 28 May 1935) was a British Communist politician. His daughter was the British-Irish-American actress Angela Lansbury.

Life and career 
Lansbury was the son of Elizabeth (née Brine) and politician George Lansbury, who was leader of the Labour Party during the 1930s.  He grew up in Poplar in the East End of London, and joined the Civil Service at a young age.  In 1910 he left to set up with his brother as timber merchants.

Lansbury was elected to Poplar Council in 1912, serving alongside his father.  He represented both the Labour Party and (after its foundation in 1920) the Communist Party of Great Britain (CPGB).  Later in 1912 he worked on his father's campaign for Parliamentary re-election, after resignation over the issue, on a radical platform of women's suffrage at the Bow and Bromley by-election.  He also supported Sylvia Pankhurst's East London Federation of Suffragettes, serving as Honorary Treasurer in 1915.

In 1917 he became liable to call-up for military service, and an initial application for exemption as a conscientious objector was refused, but the refusal was overturned by the London County Military Service Appeal Tribunal.

In 1921 Lansbury was one of 30 Poplar councillors to be jailed as a result of the Poplar Rates Rebellion, while in 1924 he was elected as a substitute member of the CPGB's Central Committee. After his first wife Minnie Lansbury died in 1922, he married actress Moyna Macgill and the two moved to Regent's Park.  From 1924 to 1925 he served as Mayor of Poplar,  the country's second Communist mayor after Joe Vaughan.  He left the Council in 1925, the same year that his first child, the future actress, Angela Lansbury, was born.  Subsequent twin sons, Bruce and Edgar Jr., later became prominent film and TV producers.

In 1927 the Lansburys' timber firm was declared bankrupt.  In 1934 Lansbury wrote George Lansbury, My Father.  In the work he inadvertently quoted from confidential documents his father had allowed him to see.  He was found to have contravened section 2 of the Official Secrets Act 1911, and fined; his book was recalled in order for the text to be censored.  He died of stomach cancer in 1935.

Publications by Lansbury 
 Poplarism ; The Truth about the Poplar Scale Relief and the Action of the Ministry of Health (1924)
 George Lansbury, My Father (1934)

References

Sources 
Janine Booth, "Guilty and Proud of it – Poplar's Rebel Councillors and Guardians 1919-1925", Merlin Press, 2009.

1887 births
1935 deaths
19th-century English people
20th-century English politicians
Communist Party of Great Britain councillors
Members of Poplar Metropolitan Borough Council
Labour Party (UK) councillors
Mayors of places in Greater London
Members of the Workers' Socialist Federation
British conscientious objectors
Deaths from cancer in England
Deaths from stomach cancer
Lansbury family
Politicians from London
People from Poplar, London